Haggarty is a surname. Notable people by that name include:

 George Haggarty (1902–1971), American basketball and baseball player.
 Gary Haggarty (born c. 1973), former leader of an Ulster Volunteer Force unit.
 James Haggarty (1914–1998), Canadian ice hockey player.
 Matt Haggarty, English rugby league footballer.